Jean-Marc Vallée  (March 9, 1963December 25, 2021) was a Canadian filmmaker, film editor, and screenwriter. After studying film at the Université de Montréal, Vallée went on to make a number of critically acclaimed short films, including Stéréotypes (1991), Les Fleurs magiques (1995), and Les Mots magiques (1998).

His debut feature, Black List (1995), was nominated for nine Genie Awards, including nods for Vallée's direction and editing. His fourth feature film, C.R.A.Z.Y. (2005), received further critical acclaim and was a financial success. He was such a perfectionist, and budgets were so tight, the film took almost ten years to make. Vallée's follow-up, The Young Victoria (2009), garnered strong reviews and received three Academy Award nominations. He was offered this film by producer Graham King, who was impressed by C.R.A.Z.Y. and wanted Vallée to make something similar. Vallée was initially unsure about accepting this offer, as he didn't much care about period films, or the British monarchy. However, his love for a cinematic challenge won out, and he researched Queen Victoria in great depth before starting the film. His sixth film, Café de Flore (2011), was the most nominated film at the 32nd Genie Awards. Vallée's next films, the American dramas Dallas Buyers Club (2013) and Wild (2014) continued this acclaim and the former earned him a nomination for the Academy Award for Best Film Editing. He was a member of the Academy of Motion Picture Arts and Sciences in the Director's Branch from 2014 until his death in 2021.

He was known for his naturalistic approach to filming, encouraging actors to improvise during takes, and used natural lighting and handheld cameras. He described himself as being like "a kid on a set. A kid playing with a huge toy and having fun".

Vallée ventured into television by executive producing and directing two projects for HBO, the drama series Big Little Lies (2017) and the thriller miniseries Sharp Objects (2018). For the former, he won the Primetime Emmy Award for Outstanding Directing for a Limited Series, Movie, or Dramatic Special.

Early life
Vallée was born and raised in Montreal, Quebec, one of four children. He studied filmmaking at the Collège Ahuntsic and the Université de Montréal.

Career

1980s: Music videos and short films 
Vallée's earliest-known works include five music videos written and directed in August 1985. The music videos were part of a project by Les Productions Perfo 30 to produce 30 music videos in 30 days for a total budget of not over $50,000 CAD. Les Productions Perfo 30 had been founded earlier that year in May 1985 by André Fortin, Martin-Éric Ouellette and Martin Saint-Pierre, and wound up producing a total of 32 music videos, all directed during the month of August, with editing spanning September and October. Vallée was one of four directors (along with Fortin, Ouellette and Claude Grégoire) to helm directorial duties. His music videos included Wild Touch's My Chick Is In My Bed, Glockenspiel's Odeline, Park Avenue's Don't Talk To Strangers, Angel's Angel's Evolution and New News' The Splice Of Life. The music videos premiered theatrically at the Spectrum in Montreal on November 1, 1985, for a limited press screening, then officially on November 9, 1985, for the general public. The music videos later aired on Canadian television through MuchMusic.

In the 1990s, Vallée produced a number of short films that aroused considerable critical interest. In 1991, Stereotypes, a fantastique comedy inspired by some American classic films, received numerous prizes at several events, including Best Promising Director for Vallée at the Rendez-vous du cinéma québécois.

Vallée later adopted a more personal and autobiographical tone with Magical Flowers (Les Fleurs magiques) (1995) and Magical Words (Les Mots magiques) (1998), awarded respectively Best Short Film at the 16th Genie Awards and the 1st Jutra Awards, in which the director explored the relationship between father and son.

1995–2005: Directorial film debut 
Vallée made his feature-length debut in 1995 with Liste noire (Black List), which became the highest-grossing film in Quebec that year and received nine Genie Award nominations, including Best Motion Picture and Best Achievement in Direction. In the wake of this success, Vallée moved to Los Angeles where he directed Los Locos (1998), a Western film written by and starring Mario Van Peebles, and Loser Love (1999). After these two low-budget productions, he directed two episodes of the television series The Secret Adventures of Jules Verne (2000).

During the mid-1990s, Vallée was preparing C.R.A.Z.Y. from a screenplay inspired by his own youth and that of his co-writer, François Boulay. Vallée wanted to shoot the film in the United States, but his friend Michel Côté, who also starred in Black List, convinced him to shoot in Quebec. After ten years in production, C.R.A.Z.Y. was finally released in 2005 and became one of the most successful films in Quebec history, both financially and critically.

It tells the story of Zachary Beaulieu, a young man dealing with homophobia and heterosexism while growing up with four brothers and a conservative father in 1960s and 1970s Quebec. The role of Zachary Beaulieu was portrayed by Marc-André Grondin, while Michel Côté and Danielle Proulx starred as Zachary's parents. C.R.A.Z.Y. had its world premiere at the 2005 Toronto International Film Festival and was awarded Best Canadian Feature Film. It received unanimous praise from film critics, with the film aggregator website, Rotten Tomatoes, giving the film a 100% "Certified Fresh" rating, based on reviews from 17 critics. It received several accolades, including eleven Genie Awards and thirteen Jutra Awards. C.R.A.Z.Y. was also selected as Canada's official submission for the 2005 Academy Award for Best Foreign Language Film.

2009–2015: Established career 
The Young Victoria (2009)After the success of C.R.A.Z.Y., Graham King and Martin Scorsese hired Jean-Marc Vallée to direct the period drama The Young Victoria. Written by Julian Fellowes, the film is based on the early life and reign of Queen Victoria, and her marriage to Prince Albert of Saxe-Coburg and Gotha. The film stars Emily Blunt, Rupert Friend, Paul Bettany, Miranda Richardson, and Jim Broadbent among a large ensemble cast. Critical reception was generally positive and the film was nominated for three Academy Awards, winning the 2009 Academy Award for Best Costume Design.Café de Flore (2011)In 2011, Vallée wrote, directed, and edited Café de Flore, a love story which connects a man and woman living in present-day Montreal with a mother and her son in 1960s Paris. The film starred French pop star Vanessa Paradis and Québécois actors Kevin Parent, Hélène Florent, and Evelyne Brochu. It received generally positive reviews from Canadian film critics and garnered thirteen nominations at the 32nd Genie Awards. American reviews were more mixed; Variety's Boyd van Hoeij saluted the film's casting, but deemed Café de Flore unoriginal, noting that "Vallée has taken what made C.R.A.Z.Y so successful, and simply tried to replicate it on a slightly larger scale. [Occasionally] similarities between the films... are so striking it almost feels like Vallée's ripping himself off".Dallas Buyers Club (2013)Vallée's next film, Dallas Buyers Club, starred Matthew McConaughey, Jared Leto, and Jennifer Garner. The film is based on the true-life tale of Ron Woodroof, an electrician in Texas diagnosed with AIDS and given 30 days to live, who began smuggling alternative medicine and not-yet-approved drugs into the United States to help himself and other AIDS patients. 
The film was released in 2013 to critical acclaim, earning Matthew McConaughey the Golden Globe Award for Best Actor and Jared Leto a Golden Globe Award for Best Supporting Actor. The film was nominated for six Academy Awards, including Best Picture and Best Original Screenplay, and won the awards for Best Actor for McConaughey, and Best Supporting Actor for Leto. Vallée also received a nomination for the Academy Award for Best Film Editing under his alias, John Mac McMurphy.Wild (2014)Vallée's film Wild, starring Reese Witherspoon, premiered on August 29, 2014, at the Telluride Film Festival, and was also featured at the Toronto International Film Festival on September 8 and the San Diego Film Festival on September 24. It was released in North America on December 5, 2014. The film was nominated for two Academy Awards, Best Actress for Reese Witherspoon, and Best Supporting Actress for Laura Dern.

In May 2015, Vallée received the National Arts Centre Award, a companion award of the Governor General's Performing Arts Awards, given to an artist in recognition of work of an extraordinary nature over the previous performance year.Demolition (2015)

Vallée's next film, Demolition (2015), starred Jake Gyllenhaal and Naomi Watts, and opened the Toronto International Film Festival in September 2015.

2017–2019: HBO limited series 
Big Little Lies (2017–2019)

In 2017, he directed and executive-produced the acclaimed HBO miniseries Big Little Lies, winning a Primetime Emmy Award for Outstanding Directing for a Limited Series, Movie, or Dramatic Special.

Sharp Objects'' (2018)

Vallée also directed and executive-produced all the episodes of Sharp Objects for HBO in 2018. The series was based on the novel by Gillian Flynn. In April 2021, he and Nathan Ross via Crazyrose signed a deal with HBO and HBO Max.

Unfinished projects 

Prior to his death, Vallée was set to direct the HBO miniseries Gorilla and the Bird.

Personal life and death
Vallée was married to Chantal Cadieux from 1990 until their divorce in 2006. They had two sons, Alex and Émile. Vallée was made an Officer of the Order of Canada (OC) in 2017, and an officer in the National Order of Quebec (OQ) in 2020. His son with Cadieux, Émile, played the part of Young Zachary in his 2005 film, C.R.A.Z.Y.On December 25, 2021 Vallée died at the age of 58 from a cardiac arrhythmia secondary to severe atherosclerosis. He was found at his chalet in Berthier-sur-Mer, Quebec.

Following his death, the Directors Guild of Canada renamed its DGC Discovery Award for emerging filmmakers to the Jean-Marc Vallée DGC Discovery Award in his memory, and filmmaker Marie-Julie Dallaire announced the production of Cut Print Thank You Bye'', a documentary film about Vallée's life and career.

Filmography
Short films

Feature films

Television

Awards and nominations

Explanatory notes

References

External links 

 
 
 
 Entry at thecanadianencyclopedia.ca

1963 births
2021 deaths
20th-century Canadian male writers
20th-century Canadian screenwriters
21st-century Canadian male writers
21st-century Canadian screenwriters
Best Director Genie and Canadian Screen Award winners
Best Screenplay Genie and Canadian Screen Award winners
Canadian film editors
Film producers from Quebec
Canadian television directors
English-language film directors
Film directors from Montreal
French-language film directors
Governor General's Performing Arts Award winners
Officers of the Order of Canada
Officers of the National Order of Quebec
Université de Montréal alumni
French Quebecers
Writers from Montreal
Deaths from atherosclerosis
Best Director Jutra and Iris Award winners